{{DISPLAYTITLE:C31H52O4}}
The molecular formula C31H52O4 (molar mass: 488.74 g/mol) may refer to:

 Balsaminol B, or 7β-methoxycucurbita-5,24-diene-3β,23(R),29-triol
 Cucurbalsaminol B

Molecular formulas